Ambrée may refer to:
Beer in Belgium#Amber ales
Pale ale#Amber ale
Lager#Dark lager